The Sign of Four is a 1923 British silent mystery film directed by Maurice Elvey and starring Eille Norwood, Isobel Elsom and Fred Raynham. The film is based on the 1890 novel The Sign of the Four by Arthur Conan Doyle, and was one of a series of Sherlock Holmes films starring Norwood.

Premise
Holmes and Watson are called in to investigate a strange murder in South London which appears to have its roots in events in India some years before.

Production
Previous Watson performer Hubert Willis was replaced by Arthur M. Cullin in the role as director Maurice Elvey felt that Willis was too old to woo the much younger Isobel Elsom as Mary Morstan. Norwood was unimpressed with Cullin in the role although Cullin brought previous experience having played Watson to H. A. Saintsbury's Holmes in The Valley of Fear.

The climactic chase on the Thames was shot on location.

Cast
 Eille Norwood - Sherlock Holmes
 Isobel Elsom - Mary Morstan
 Fred Raynham - Prince Abdullah Khan 
 Arthur M. Cullin - Doctor John Watson 
 Norman Page - Jonathan Small 
 Humberston Wright - Doctor Sholto 
 Henry Wilson - Pygmy 
 Madame d'Esterre - Mrs Hudson
 Arthur Bell - Inspector Athelney Jones

See also
Sherlock Holmes (Stoll film series)

References

External links

1923 films
British silent feature films
1923 crime films
1920s English-language films
Films directed by Maurice Elvey
Sherlock Holmes films based on works by Arthur Conan Doyle
British black-and-white films
British crime films
1923 mystery films
British mystery films
1920s British films
Silent mystery films
Silent thriller films